Michael Robert Quinlan (born December 9, 1944) is a graduate, and currently the chairman, of Loyola University Chicago, where he was initiated into the Alpha Delta Gamma National Fraternity. Quinlan served as a director of McDonald's Corporation, from 1979 until his retirement in 2002. He was the chairman of the board of directors of McDonald's from March 1990 to May 1999 and chief executive officer from March 1987 through July 1998. Quinlan became President and COO in 1982. Quinlan started with McDonald's in 1963 in the mailroom and worked his way up to senior management. Quinlan got the job through his roommate John Martino, the son of June Martino McDonald's secretary.

Quinlan and his wife, Marilyn, donated approximately one-third of the $40 million raised to construct the new Life Sciences Building at Loyola, completed in 2004.  The building was dedicated as the Michael R. and Marilyn C. Quinlan Life Sciences Education and Research Center on December 3, 2004.

On June 2, 2012, during Loyola's annual Founder's Dinner, it was announced that Quinlan was donating $40 million to Loyola. The donation will help grow the business school's endowment to
attract top faculty, support students, and create cutting‐edge programs to meet market
demands. Loyola renamed its School of Business Administration and the affiliated Graduate School of Business to the Michael R. Quinlan School of Business.

References

Living people
Loyola University Chicago alumni
McDonald's people
1944 births
People from Chicago
20th-century American businesspeople